Thia may refer to:

 Thia, a genus in which the thumbnail crab is the only extant species
 Tegeticula, a prodoxid moth genus invalidly described as Thia by H. Edwards in 1888
 405 Thia, an asteroid
 Thia Megia (born 1995), a contestant in the 10th season of American Idol
 Henry Thia (born 1952), Singaporean former actor and comedian

See also
 Thea (disambiguation)
 Theia (disambiguation)